Aljustrel is a town and a municipality in the Portuguese district of Beja. The population in 2011 was 9,257, in an area of 458.47 km2. The present mayor is Nelson Domingos Brito, elected by the Socialist Party. The municipal holiday is June 13.

History
During the Roman era, Aljustrel was known as Metallum Vispascense. It was occupied by the Moors but in 1235 the town was conquered from them by King D. Sancho II.

The first foral (charter) was only conceded by King Sancho in 1252.

A new foral was issued on 20 September 1510, by King D. Manuel I.

On 28 January 2013, the civil parishes of Aljustrel and Rio dos Minhos were aggregated into one local authority called Aljustrel (Decree 11-A/2013, Diário da República, Série 1, 19).

Geography
Administratively, the municipality is divided into 4 civil parishes:
 Aljustrel e Rio de Moinhos
 Ervidel
 Messejana
 São João de Negrilhos

International relations
Aljustrel is twinned with:
  Hem, in the département of Nord, France

Notable People

Notable people from Aljustrel include:
Manuel de Brito Camacho (1862—1934) a military officer, writer, publicist and politician; High Commissioner to Portuguese Mozambique, 1921-1923
António Lobo de Almada Negreiros (1868–1939) a journalist and colonialist writer, essayist and poet; he lived in São Tomé Island
Fernanda Peleja Patrício (19292000). Portuguese communist who opposed the Estado Novo regime, president of the Aljustrel council, 1986–1989.
João Rebelo (born 1961) a former sport shooter who competed in each Summer Olympics from 1984 to 2000
Jorge Soares (born 1971) a Portuguese retired footballer with 396 club caps

Architecture

Civic
 Cinema/Theatre of Aljustrel
 Fountain of Alonso Gomes
 Mines of Aljustrel
 Mines of São João do Deserto
 Municipal Palace/Hall of Messejana
 Museum of the Santa Casa da Misericórdia
 Pillory of Messejana
 Residence of the Majorat Moreiras

Military
 Castle of Aljustrel
 Castle of Messejana

Religious
 Chapel of the Santa Casa da Misericórdia
 Chapel of São Pedro
 Church of Nossa Senhora da Assunção
 Church of Nossa Senhora do Castelo
 Church of Nossa Senhora do Rosário
 Church of the Santa Casa da Misericórdia of Messejana
 Church of the Santissimo Salvador
 Church of São João
 Church of São Julião
 Hermitage of Santa Margarida
 Stations of the Cross of Messejana

References

 
Populated places in Beja District
Municipalities of Beja District